Ricardo Montemayor (born 23 December 1991 in Mexico D.F.) is a Mexican sailor. He competed at the 2012 Summer Olympics in the Men's Laser class, where he achieved a place of 38th out of 49.

References

1991 births
Living people
Mexican male sailors (sport)
Olympic sailors of Mexico
Sailors at the 2012 Summer Olympics – Laser